The Missing Clerk is a 1971 Danish comedy film directed by Gert Fredholm. It was entered into the 22nd Berlin International Film Festival.

Cast
 Ove Sprogøe as Teodor Amsted
 Bodil Kjer as Mrs. Amsted
 Karl Stegger as Martin Hageholm
 Poul Thomsen as Jens Jensen
  as Politiassistent Munk
 Hans-Henrik Krause as Politikommisær Skovstrup
 Valsø Holm as Kontorchef
  as Fru Møller
 Jytte Abildstrøm as Frk. Liljenfeldt
 Vera Gebuhr as Fru Mörtel
  as Fuldmægtig Degerstrøm
  as Servitricen Ulla (as Ulla Lemvigh-Müller)
  as Karen
 Ole Varde Lassen as Forsvarer
  as Johanne

See also
 List of submissions to the 44th Academy Awards for Best Foreign Language Film
 List of Danish submissions for the Academy Award for Best Foreign Language Film

References

External links
 
 
 

1971 comedy films
1971 films
Danish comedy films
1970s Danish-language films
Films directed by Gert Fredholm
Best Danish Film Bodil Award winners